Jia Rongqing is a Canadian mathematician of Chinese origin who is a mathematics professor at the University of Alberta researching approximation theory and wavelet analysis.

Life
He was an undergraduate student at the Zhejiang University in Hangzhou, China, where he obtained his Bachelor of Science in 1968. In 1980, he went to the University of Wisconsin–Madison and undertook M.Sc and Ph.D work under the supervision of Carl-Wilhelm de Boor, receiving his Ph.D. in 1983. 

He is a professor of mathematics at the University of Alberta in Edmonton, Alberta.

Selected publications
R.Q. Jia, Smoothness of multivariate refinable functions in Sobolev spaces, Trans. Amer. Math. Soc.351 (1999) 4089-4112.
R.Q. Jia, Shift-invariant spaces and linear operator equations, Israel Math. J. 103 (1998), 259-288.
R.Q. Jia, Approximation properties of multivariate wavelets, Mathematics of Computation 67 (1998), 647-665
R.Q. Jia, Perturbation of polynomial ideals, Advances in Applied Mathematics 17 (1996), 308-336.
R.Q. Jia, The Toeplitz theorem and its applications to approximation theory and linear PDE's, Trans. Amer. Math. Soc. 347 (1995), 2585-2594.

References

External links
Rong-Qing Jia's office website at the University of Alberta

20th-century Canadian mathematicians
Academic staff of the University of Alberta
Zhejiang University alumni
University of Wisconsin–Madison alumni
Living people
Year of birth missing (living people)
21st-century Canadian mathematicians
Chinese emigrants to Canada